Route 339 is a provincial highway that is situated in the Lanaudière region of Quebec. It runs from the junction of Route 344 in L'Assomption northeast of Montreal and ends at the junctions of Route 158, Route 335  and Route 337 in Saint-Lin-Laurentides, 32 kilometers to the north.

Municipalities along Route 339

 L'Assomption
 L'Épiphanie
 Saint-Roch-de-l'Achigan
 Saint-Roch-Ouest 
 Saint-Lin-Laurentides

Major intersections

See also
 List of Quebec provincial highways

References

External links 
 Official Transports Quebec Map 
route 339 on Google Maps

339